The Vergina Sun, also known as the Star of Vergina, Vergina Star or Argead Star is a rayed solar symbol first appearing in ancient Greek art of the period between the 6th and 2nd centuries BC. The Vergina Sun proper has sixteen triangular rays, while comparable symbols of the same period variously have sixteen, twelve, eight or (rarely) six rays.

The name "Vergina Sun" became widely used after the archaeological excavations in and around the small town of Vergina, in northern Greece, during the late 1970s. In older references, the name "Argead Star" or "Star of the Argeadai" is used for the Sun as the possible royal symbol of the Argead dynasty of the ancient kingdom of Macedonia. There it was depicted on a golden larnax found in a 4th-century BC royal tomb belonging to either Philip II or Philip III of Macedon, the father and half-brother of Alexander the Great, respectively.

Tentatively interpreted as the historical royal symbol of ancient Macedonia, rather than just a generic decorative element in ancient Greek art, the Vergina Sun came into popular use among Macedonian Greeks since the 1980s, and became commonly used as an official emblem in the Greek region of Macedonia, and by other Greek state entities during the 1990s.

The Vergina Sun symbol was the subject in a controversy in the first half of 1990s between Greece and the newly independent Republic of Macedonia (now North Macedonia), which adopted it as a symbol of Macedonian nationalism and depicted it on its national flag. Eventually, in 1995 and as a result of this dispute, the young republic's flag was revised into a different rayed solar symbol. On 17 June 2018, the two countries signed the Prespa Agreement, which stipulates the removal of the Vergina Sun from public use in North Macedonia. Eventually, in early July 2019 the government of North Macedonia announced the complete removal of the symbol from all public areas, institutions and monuments in the country, except archeological sites.

Antiquity

Early representations of the symbol go back to at least the 6th century BC, with hoplites depicted as bearing sixteen-pointed and eight-pointed sunburst symbols on their shields and armor, and the same symbols being represented on coins from both island and mainland Greece from at least the 5th century BC. The Iliad describes the first panoply of Achilles as having star motifs.

During his excavations at Vergina, the site of the ancient Macedonian capital of Aegae, the archaeologist Manolis Andronikos found the symbol on the coffin (larnax) believed to belong to Philip II of Macedon, father of Alexander the Great. The "sunburst" symbol was already well known as a symbol used both by the Macedonian royal dynasty (e.g. on coins), as well as being present in the Hellenistic civilization more generally. The symbol might represent the Sun god (Helios), whose role as a patron deity of the Argead dynasty might be implied by a story about Perdiccas I of Macedon narrated by Herodotus (8.127). In the early 1980s, following the discovery of the larnax, there was some debate as to whether the symbol should be considered the "royal emblem" of the Argeads specifically. Αs Eugene Borza (1982) pointed out, the symbol was widely used in Hellenistic-era art, and Adams (1983) emphasized its use as a decorative element in ancient Greek art in general and that it cannot be said to represent either a "royal" or "national" emblem of Macedon exclusively.

Golden Larnax
In 1977/8, archaeologist Manolis Andronikos led excavations of burial mounds at the small Central Macedonian town of Vergina in Greece. There, by the perimeter of a large mound, the Great Tumulus, he unearthed three tombs. The tombs were subsequently identified as royal burial sites for members of the late 4th-century BC Argead dynasty, the family of Alexander the Great.

Of the three tombs, the first—Tomb I—suffered looting, leaving little more by the time of its discovery than then the well known wall painting depicting the Abduction of Persephone by Hades and the buried fragments of human remains. Tombs II and III, however, remained undisturbed, still containing many artefacts. Among them were two gold ash coffins (larnakes) in Tomb II and a silver funerary urn in Tomb III.

The coffin of Tomb II's primary occupant, the Golden Larnax, featured the sixteen-rayed sun design and that of the occupant's wife, entombed in the antechamber, a twelve-ray sun. Andronikos variously described the symbol as a "star", "starburst", and "sunburst". He posited the tomb might belong to King Philip II of Macedon, father of Alexander the Great.

Following the discovery at the Great Tumulus, there was much debate over who had been buried there, especially in Tomb II. It dated to the later half of the 4th century BC, making its royal occupants contemporaneous with Alexander the Great. As Alexander himself had been buried in Egypt, the only remaining plausible Argead men and their wives likely to be buried in Tomb II were Philip II and his last wife Cleopatra Eurydice, or Alexander's half-brother Philip III Arrhidaeus and Eurydice II.

On 21 April 2000, the AAAS journal Science published "The Eye Injury of King Philip II and the Skeletal Evidence from the Royal Tomb II at Vergina", by Antonis Bartsiokas. In it, Bartsiokas cited osteological analyses to contradict the determination of Philip II as the tomb's occupant and made a case for Philip III. However, a good deal of evidence still contradicts Bartsiokas' claims.

During 1992 and 1993, the Great Tumulus was rebuilt.

Gallery

Modern reception

Official status in Greece 

The symbol was introduced in Greece as popular imagery from the mid-1980s and, after 1991, increasingly so in many new contexts in Greece. The Vergina Sun was widely adopted by Greek Macedonians as a symbol of Greek Macedonia. The Vergina Sun on a blue background became commonly used as an official emblem of the three administrative regions, the prefectures and the municipalities of Greek Macedonia.

It was used in official contexts on the reverse of the Greek 100 drachmas coin of 1990–2001,
The symbol is placed on the bottom left corner of the Greek driving license, and on Greek passports, it forms the watermark image across pages 22 and 23. It is the emblem of the 3rd Greek Squadron of Control and Warning Station, of Greek Units for the Reinstatement of Order, the Greek First Army, the 193 Squadron of Multiple Missile Launchers and the 34th Mechanized Infantry Brigade.

In February 1993 the Greek parliament passed a bill designating the Vergina Sun as an official Greek national symbol. In July 1995, Greece lodged a claim for trademark protection of the Vergina Sun as an official state emblem under Article 6ter of the Paris Convention for the Protection of Industrial Property with the World Intellectual Property Organization (WIPO).

North Macedonia

In North Macedonia, the symbol is known as Sun of Kutleš. In 1991, Todor Petrov proposed the Vergina Sun as the national symbol of the Republic of Macedonia (now North Macedonia). The symbol was adopted by the Macedonians, as a symbol of the newly independent Republic of Macedonia and in 1992 the newly formed country displayed the symbol on its new flag. This lasted until 1995, when the Republic of Macedonia was forced to modify its flag by Greece.

The decision in the Republic of Macedonia caused controversy both within the republic and outside it in its relations with Greece. The republic's large Albanian minority complained that it was an ethnic symbol of the ethnic Macedonian national identity and was not suitable for a multi-ethnic state.
Greek opposition was even more vehement. The Greek government and many Greek people, especially Greek Macedonians, saw it as the misappropriation of a Hellenic symbol and a direct claim on the legacy of Philip II. The dispute was exacerbated by clauses in the Republic of Macedonia's constitution that Greeks saw as a territorial claim on the Greek region of Macedonia. A Greek Foreign Ministry spokesman said in January 1995 that "the symbol is Greek and has been stolen." Nationalists on both sides subsequently associated the symbol with the (much later) Star of Bethlehem and have argued that their respective communities have used the symbol for sacred purposes before the Vergina discovery. 

Speaking on the BBC World Service's The World Today programme, archaeologist Bajana Mojsov from the Republic of Macedonia said that "the symbolic weight attached to the Vergina Star was archaeologically absurd – but politically inevitable," arguing:

At the same time, Demetrius Floudas, Senior Associate at Hughes Hall, Cambridge, and one of the leading analysts of the Macedonia naming dispute, claimed that:

Although the authorities in Skopje denied any ulterior motives, the flag became a major issue in the wider political dispute between the two countries of the early 1990s (see Foreign relations of North Macedonia). Greek objections led to the flag being banned from use in a variety of places, including the United Nations, the Olympic Games and offices of the Republic of Macedonia in the United States and Australia.

The Republic of Macedonia lodged an objection against Greece's registration of the symbol with WIPO in October 1995. The dispute was partially resolved under a compromise brokered by Cyrus Vance at the United Nations.
The symbol was removed from the flag of the Republic of Macedonia as part of an agreement to establish diplomatic and economic relations between the two sides, and it was replaced by a stylised yellow sun with eight widening beams on red ground. The symbol was not referred to as the "Star of Vergina" in the agreement as signed, although the Greeks described it as such in correspondence with Vance.

The Liberal Party (LP) of the Republic of Macedonia, in December 2013, via its president Yvonne Velickovski, proposed with a draft law to ban the use of the Vergina Sun for civil purposes within the Republic of Macedonia, as "a positive step that will result in the promotion of good neighborly relations between Macedonia and Greece".
The draft law requires use of the WIPO-protected Greek symbol to be banned in the Macedonian president's office, events organized under state administration, public Macedonian institutions or political parties, NGOs, media, as well as individuals in the Republic of Macedonia. The draft however was rejected in December 2013 by the majority of the Macedonian Parliament, which at the time was controlled by the nationalist VMRO-DPMNE party.

In early August 2017, the Macedonian consul in Toronto, Canada, Jovica Palashevski, sparked a diplomatic incident between the Republic of Macedonia and Greece, when he delivered a speech against the backdrop of an irredentist map of Greater Macedonia and a red Vergina Sun flag. After strong Greek protests, the Foreign Ministry of the Republic of Macedonia condemned the incident and recalled its diplomat back to Skopje for consultations.

Toni Deskoski, Macedonian professor of International Law and member of the legal team that represented the Republic of Macedonia in the naming dispute with Greece before the International Court of Justice in the Hague for violation of the Interim Accord, argues that the Vergina Sun is not a Macedonian symbol but it's a Greek symbol that is used by Macedonians in the nationalist context of Macedonism and that the Macedonians need to get rid of it.

Private use

Greece

Outside of official usage, the symbol was also used in the logo of the Thessaloniki-based Makedonia television station, and of the Bank of Macedonia-Thrace. An eight-point sun is the logo of Thessaloniki International Film Festival and part of the logo of Greek Parliament party Greek Solution. A six-pointed Vergina sun is the logo of the Thessaloniki-based Vergina television station, it also appears on Municipality of Chalkidona coat of arms in Thessaloniki region unit, on Makedonikos FC logo which is a Greek professional football club based in Neapoli, on ASF ALEXANDRIAS in Imathia, on Makedonikos Foufas F.C. in Kozani, on MAS VERGINA, on Megas Alexandros BC in Leptokarya and on VERGINA BC in Kalamaria. A seven-pointed sun is the logo of Thessaloniki-based political party EPOS. A sixteen-pointed sun is the logo of Athens-based political party Patriotic Union.
It is also used by organisations of the Greek Macedonian diaspora, such as the Pan-Macedonian Association, as well as by numerous commercial enterprises and in Greek Macedonian demonstrations.

North Macedonia 
In North Macedonia, the municipality of Makedonska Kamenica still displays it on its municipal flag.
According to Macedonian press reports from 2005, a similar choice was made by the municipality of Liqenas in neighbouring Albania, which has a Macedonian population.

The symbol is also used by other ethnic Macedonian minority groups in neighbouring countries and by diaspora organisations. In Canada, a Macedonian advocacy group called United Macedonians Organization uses a stylized version of the sun as part of its logo and makes extensive use of the red Vergina Sun flag.

In 2018, IP Australia, the agency of the Australian Department of Industry, Innovation and Science responsible for administering the intellectual property rights in Australia, denied the World Macedonian Congress the right of registering and using the Vergina Sun on its trademark, citing the Paris Convention which recognizes the emblem as a national symbol of Greece.

The Vergina Sun has often been used as a symbol of the Aromanians by members of this ethnic minority in North Macedonia. Some also claim heritage from the Ancient Macedonians and state that Alexander the Great was in fact an Aromanian.

Prespa Agreement

On 17 June 2018, Greece and the Republic of Macedonia signed the Prespa Agreement, which stipulates the removal of the Vergina Sun from public use across the latter's territory.

In a session held on early July 2019, the government of North Macedonia announced the complete removal of the Vergina Sun from all public areas, institutions and monuments in the country, with the deadline for its removal being set to 12 August 2019, in line with the Prespa Agreement.

See also

Inti
Macedonia naming dispute
Radiate crown
Solar deity
Solar symbol
Sun (heraldry)

References

Footnotes

Bibliography

 Philip II, Alexander the Great and the Macedonian Heritage, ed. W. Lindsay Adams and Eugene N. Borza. University Press of America, 1982. 
 The Larnakes from Tomb II at Vergina. Archaeological News. John Paul Adams
 In the Shadow of Olympus: The Emergence of Macedon, Eugene N. Borza. Princeton University Press, 1990. 
 "Macedonia Redux", Eugene N. Borza, in The Eye Expanded: life and the arts in Greco-Roman Antiquity, ed. Frances B Tichener & Richard F. Moorton. University of California Press, 1999. 
 Macedonia: The Politics of Identity and Difference, Jane K. Cowan. Pluto Press, 2000. 
 The Macedonian Conflict: Ethnic Nationalism in a Transnational World, Loring M. Danforth. Princeton University Press, 1997. 
 Macedonia and Greece: The Struggle to Define a New Balkan Nation, McFarland & Company, 1997.

External links
Image of gold box with Vergina Sun in Thessaloniki Museum
Flags of Greek Macedonia – Flags of the World

Ancient Greek culture
Culture of Macedonia (ancient kingdom)
Heraldic charges
National symbols of Greece
Nationalist symbols
Solar symbols
Flag controversies